Zinc finger and BTB domain containing 1 is a protein in humans that is encoded by the ZBTB1 gene.

ZBTB1 is essential for the development of lymphocytes in mice: T cells are absent from ZBTB1 mutant mice, and numbers of B cells and natural killer cells are reduced.

References 

Genes on human chromosome 14